George Andrew Midsomer Leggatt, Lord Leggatt,   (born 12 November 1957) is a Justice of the Supreme Court of the United Kingdom, the highest court of law in the United Kingdom.

Education

Leggatt's father is the former Lord Justice of Appeal Sir Andrew Leggatt. Leggatt was educated at Eton College and earned a First-Class Bachelor of Arts degree in Philosophy at King's College, Cambridge in 1979. He was a Harkness Fellow at Harvard University (1979–80) and received a Diploma in Law with distinction from City Law School in 1981.

Legal career
Leggatt was called to the bar (Middle Temple) in 1983 and was appointed a Queen's Counsel in 1997. He joined Brick Court Chambers in 1985, where he practised commercial law, including areas such as banking, insurance, sales, and product liability law. He became a recorder in 2002 and was a deputy High Court judge.

On 26 October 2012, he was appointed to the High Court, receiving the customary knighthood in the 2013 Special Honours, and assigned to the Queen's Bench Division. He was appointed as a Lord Justice of Appeal in February 2018. 

In July 2019, it was announced Leggatt would become  a Justice of the Supreme Court of the United Kingdom after the retirement of Lord Carnwath. He took the judicial courtesy title of Lord Leggatt and was sworn in on 21 April 2020, in a specially adapted ceremony due to the COVID-19 pandemic. Lord Leggatt recited the judicial oath in the presence of Lord Reed, the President of the Supreme Court, whilst the other Justices watched remotely.

In 2016 Leggatt was elected a Fellow of Eton College.

Cases
 , finding a duty of good faith can be implied in English contract law
 , finding that a duty of good faith can be generally implied in law in 'relational' contracts
 , finding the United Kingdom in breach of its obligations under the European Convention on Human Rights, (specifically Article 5).  The UK lacks detention authority under international humanitarian law to capture and detain individuals for longer than 96 hours in the course of the non-international armed conflict in Afghanistan.

Notes

1957 births
Living people
People educated at Eton College
Alumni of King's College, Cambridge
Fellows of Eton College
Harvard University alumni
21st-century English judges
Knights Bachelor
Lords Justices of Appeal
Members of the Privy Council of the United Kingdom
Queen's Bench Division judges
English King's Counsel